Alexandra Fiord is a natural inlet on the Johan Peninsula of Ellesmere Island in the Qikiqtaaluk Region of Nunavut, Canada. To the east, it opens into Buchanan Bay.

History
Alexandra Fiord has a long and variable history, from the Paleo and Thule cultures that inhabited the fiord from 2500 BCE - 1500 CE, to the scientists that seasonally visit the fiord now. From 1953 to 1963, the Royal Canadian Mounted Police had a station at Alexandra Fjord which, at the time, was the northernmost police station in the world. It was then used as a seasonally scientific research base from 1987 to 1992. It is currently used as a seasonal scientific research base.

References

External links
 Photo

Ellesmere Island
Fjords of Qikiqtaaluk Region